The Arkansas County Courthouse for the Southern District is located at Courthouse Square in the center of De Witt, Arkansas, the seat for the southern county of Arkansas County.  It is a three-story brick building with Art Deco styling, designed by Little Rock architect H. Ray Burks and built in 1931.  It is one of the finest examples of Art Deco architecture in the state.  It is built in the shape of an H, with vault additions made in 1971 the only asymmetrical element.  Its main entry (on the western facade) is a simple double-leaf entry with transom window, topped by a concrete panel with floral design.  This is topped by a pair of large windows, with a concrete panel with signage and clock above and a raised parapet at the top.

The building was listed on the National Register of Historic Places in 1992.

See also
National Register of Historic Places listings in Arkansas County, Arkansas

References

Courthouses on the National Register of Historic Places in Arkansas
Art Deco architecture in Arkansas
Government buildings completed in 1931
National Register of Historic Places in Arkansas County, Arkansas
Individually listed contributing properties to historic districts on the National Register in Arkansas
1931 establishments in Arkansas
County courthouses in Arkansas
DeWitt, Arkansas